In general, colonias are neighborhoods in Mexican cities, which have no jurisdictional autonomy or representation. It is plausible that the name, which literally means 'colony', arose in the late 19th and early 20th centuries, when one of the first urban developments outside Mexico City's core was inhabited by a French colony in the city. Usually colonias are assigned a specific postal code; nonetheless, in recent urban developments, gated communities are also defined as colonias and share the postal code of adjacent neighborhoods. In spite of this, the name of the colonia must be specified when writing an address in large urban areas in Mexico.

It is a similar concept to the barangays of the Philippines.

See also

Colonia (United States)
Colonias of Mexico City

References
Diccionario Español: Colonia (In Spanish)

Demographics of Mexico
Neighbourhoods in Mexico